Cacyreus is an Afrotropical genus of butterflies in the family Lycaenidae.

Species
Cacyreus audeoudi Stempffer, 1936
Cacyreus darius (Mabille, 1877)
Cacyreus dicksoni Pennington, 1962
Cacyreus ethiopicus Tite, 1961
Cacyreus lingeus (Stoll, [1782])
Cacyreus niebuhri Larsen, 1982
Cacyreus marshalli Butler, 1897
Cacyreus tespis (Herbst, 1804)
Cacyreus virilis Stempffer, 1936

External links
 Cacyreus at Markku Savela's website on Lepidoptera
 
 

 
Lycaenidae genera